Erin Gammel (born March 13, 1980) is a competition swimmer from Canada, who competed for her native country at the 2004 Summer Olympics in Athens, Greece.  There she finished in 17th position in the 100-metre backstroke, and in 11th place with the Canadian team in the 4x100-metre medley relay.

References
Canadian Olympic Committee

1980 births
Living people
Canadian female backstroke swimmers
Medalists at the FINA World Swimming Championships (25 m)
Olympic swimmers of Canada
Sportspeople from Kamloops
Swimmers at the 1999 Pan American Games
Swimmers at the 2004 Summer Olympics
Pan American Games competitors for Canada